Earl Lloyd Gartman (June 23, 1920 – March 8, 1995) was an American football, basketball, and baseball coach and college athletics administrator.  He served as the head football coach at Howard College—now known as Samford University—in Homewood, Alabama from 1949 to 1953, at Austin Peay State University from 1958 to 1959, and at Trinity University in San Antonio, Texas from 1967 to 1969, compiling a career college football record of 30–61–1.  Gartman was also the head basketball coach at Howard from 1950 to 1955, tallying a mark of 71–73.  He was the head baseball coach at Howard from 1952 to 1955 and at the University of Texas–Pan American from 1962 to 1963, amassing a career college baseball record of 60–49.

Education
Gartman graduated from Howard College and earned a master's degree at George Peabody College, now known as Peabody College, a part of Vanderbilt University.

Head coaching record

College football

Baseball

References

External links
 

1920 births
1995 deaths
Samford Bulldogs baseball coaches
Samford Bulldogs football coaches
Samford Bulldogs men's basketball coaches
Samford Bulldogs athletic directors
Austin Peay Governors football coaches
UT Rio Grande Valley Vaqueros baseball coaches
Trinity Tigers football coaches
High school football coaches in Texas
Peabody College alumni
Samford University alumni